The United Democratic Forces (Forces Démocratiques Unies) was an alliance of political parties in the Republic of the Congo, led by Denis Sassou-Nguesso. Sassou-Nguesso, presidential candidate of both the Congolese Labour Party and the FDU, won the presidential election of 10 March 2002 with 89.4% of the vote. In the parliamentary election held on 26 May and 20 June 2002, the FDU won 30 out of 153 seats.

Defunct political party alliances in Africa
Political party alliances in the Republic of the Congo